Alex Thomas (born 10 October 1978) is an English drummer from Lutterworth, Leicestershire, who performs with Squarepusher and Air. He also performed with John Cale (2012-2013, 2023).

Thomas joined Bolt Thrower on 21 August 1997. He played drums on Mercenary and the Into The Killing Zone tour, then left the band in 2000 due to lack of interest in the musical direction that Bolt Thrower were taking.

He has also played with Badly Drawn Boy, Groop Dogdrill, New Young Pony Club, UNKLE, Saint Etienne, Bat for Lashes, played guitar with Fridge and, under the name Earl Shilton, he has released the album Two Rooms (Full of Insects) on the Invisible Spies record label.

On 29 May 2008, Natasha Khan announced the new Bat for Lashes live line-up in advance of her support slot on the Radiohead 2008 European tour. "The Blue Dreams" includes Thomas.

As of 2018 Alex has been playing with Anna Calvi, appearing on her album Hunter. On 2 September 2019, Alex was welcomed in to the Zildjian Family of worldwide artists.

Selected discography 

 Bolt Thrower - Mercenary (1998)
 Earl Shilton - Two Rooms Full of Insects (2003)
 Badly Drawn Boy - One Plus One Is One (2004)
 Adem - Love and Other Planets (2006)
 Badly Drawn Boy - Born in the U.K. (2006)
 Supreme Vagabond Craftsman - Just You, Me and the Baby (2006)
 Bat for Lashes - Two Suns (2009)
 Philip Selway - Running Blind EP (2011)
 Air - Le Voyage Dans La Lune (2012)
 John Cale – M:FANS (2016)
 Bloc Party - Hymns (2016)
 Anna Calvi - Hunter (2018)

References

1978 births
Living people
English heavy metal drummers
Bolt Thrower members
People from Lutterworth
Musicians from Leicestershire
Frost* members
21st-century drummers
Chrome Hoof members